Corleto Perticara is a town and comune in the province of Potenza, in the Southern Italian region of Basilicata. It is bounded by the comuni of Armento, Gorgoglione, Guardia Perticara, Laurenzana, Montemurro, Pietrapertosa, Viggiano.

Twin towns
 Poggibonsi, Italy

Notable people
 Jack Bonadies, American football player

References

Cities and towns in Basilicata